Acne Studios is a multidisciplinary luxury fashion house based in Stockholm, Sweden that specializes in men's and women's ready-to-wear fashion, footwear, accessories and denim. When founded in 1996, the label derived its name from the creative collective ACNE; initially an acronym for Associated Computer Nerd Enterprises and later a backronym of Ambition to Create Novel Expressions.

Founder and Creative Director Jonny Johannson's interest in photography, art, architecture and contemporary culture is reflected in the brand's clothing, publications, furniture, exhibitions and special collaborations.

History
Acne Studios was founded in 1996 in Stockholm, Sweden as part of the creative collective ACNE that focused on graphic design, film, production and advertising. In 1997, cofounder Jonny Johansson created 100 pairs of raw denim jeans with red stitching and gave them away to friends and family. Wallpaper* and Vogue Paris quickly picked up on the popularity of the jeans and Acne Studios rapidly expanded their fashion offering outside of denim.

In 2006, Acne Studios became a standalone company and separated from other entities within the collective ACNE such as Acne Film, Acne Advertising and Acne Digital, at the same time launching their e-commerce operation. Since launching, Acne Studios has grown into a global fashion house with retail stores around the world including Paris, London, New York, Los Angeles, Antwerp and Tokyo, offering women's and men's ready-to-wear collections, showing at Paris Fashion Week twice a year and turning over $215 million annually in 2016. In December 2018 IDG Capital and I.T Group acquired stakes of 30.1% and 10.9% respectively, from the investment companies Creades, Öresund and PAN Capital. Jonny Johansson and the executive chairman Mikael Schiller remained as majority shareholders.

Products 

Acne Studios design men's and women's ready-to-wear fashion, footwear, denim, and accessories including handbags, small leather goods, and eyewear.

Acne Studios stages runway fashion shows for its women's Fall/Winter and Spring/Summer collections twice a year.

On April 6, 2017, Acne Studios relaunched its denim collection under the name Acne Studios Blå Konst (meaning "Blue Art" in Swedish) at all of their retail locations and on Acnestudios.com. This launch consists of men's and women's ready-to-wear, jeans, and accessories. In addition, an Acne Studios Blå Konst pop-up shop located in Tokyo's Shibuya district was opened to showcase the launch, which it houses exclusively. Six new denim styles including the North, River, and Land for men and the Climb, South, and Log for women have replaced the range of existing denim products. While these jean styles are permanent, the Blå Konst ready-to-wear collection will be updated seasonally.

On August 17, 2017, Acne Studios launched its Face motif collection, featuring patches of an emoticon face with two small circles and a long rectangle.  Having first been introduced in their Autumn/Winter 2013 collection as a clutch, the face motif was featured in a unisex collection of ready-to-wear and accessories.

Marketing
Acne Studios avoids traditional forms of marketing and advertising, choosing instead to publish a biannual magazine called Acne Paper. Acne Paper covers the disciplines of art, fashion, photography, design, architecture, academia, and culture. Each issue is based around a theme that is interpreted by selected contributors from their field of expertise. Contributors to Acne Paper have included Carine Roitfeld, Noam Chomsky, David Lynch, Lord Snowdon, Azzedine Alaïa, Mario Testino, Sarah Moon, Tilda Swinton and Paolo Roversi. The fifteenth and final issue was published in 2014; Acne Paper has since been discontinued.

Campaigns 
In September 2016, Acne Studios announced its Fall/Winter 2016 campaign, shot by British photographer David Sims. The series was photographed in three parts, and each was presented globally- from posters plastered on the walls during Paris Fashion Week and Hong Kong's Golden week, on streetcars in Milan, and to digital images at London's Harrods.

For the Spring/Summer 2017 campaign, Paolo Roversi shot a portrait series featuring creatives around the world, such as Golshifteh Farahani, Fatima Al Qadiri, and Hayv Kahraman. The photography series was exhibited outdoors in New York, Paris, Milan, and Hong Kong.

For the introduction of Acne Studios Blå Konst, Collier Schorr shot the campaign featured on the homepage of AcneStudios.com. These photographs launched online along with the new products on April 6, 2017.

Collaborations
Acne Studios has collaborated widely with representatives from the creative industries to produce limited edition collections. Some examples include a range of bikes with the world's oldest bike manufacturer Bianchi Bicycles, a furniture line of sofas based on Swedish designer Carl Malmsten’s sofa Nya Berlin, a capsule collection with couture house Lanvin, an art installation and a collection with artist Katerina Jebb, a cross-gender blouse collection with transsexual magazine Candy, an art book and blue shirt line with Lord Snowdon, limited edition prints with William Wegman, a rodeo-themed book and capsule collection inspired by Bruce of Los Angeles, a collection based around artworks by abstract Swedish pioneer Hilma af Klint, and a capsule collection with Liberty London. 

More recent collaborations include a limited-edition monograph and unisex silk pajama collection with American sculptor Peter Schlesinger, small leather goods monogrammed with Jack Pierson's custom lettering, and a custom rug collection for Acne Studios' Madison Ave. location designed by British designer Max Lamb and Swedish rug company Kasthall.

In 2019, Acne Studios released capsule clothing collections made in collaboration with Starter Black Label and with NBA player Russel Westbrook.

In 2020, Acne Studios released a capsule clothing collection featuring artwork from Monster in My Pocket.

Publications 
In 2012, Acne Studios and photographer Lord Snowdon collaborated to launch Acne Studios' first published book: Snowdon Blue. The publication included Snowdon's portraits of David Bowie, Serge Gainsbourg, Manolo Blahnik and more, all dressed in blue shirts. A limited-edition collection of 8 styles of blue button-ups alluding to the book's visuals were also created and sold both in-store and online. Acne Studios' second photography book, Bruce of Los Angeles: Rodeo, presents photographer Bruce Bellas' shots of American cowboys. In addition, Jonny Johannson designed a  collection of western-themed tops, jeans, and boots to embody the classic American theme. Peter Schlesinger Sculpture was released by Acne Studios in conjunction with a capsule collection of silk loungewear on April 29, 2015. The book features photos of over 150 of American sculptor Peter Schlesinger's works since the 1980s, and was shot by Eric Boman. The monograph's photos were accompanied by Swedish text and printed on Japanese paper.

The Spring/Summer 2017 campaign, shot by Paolo Roversi, was also released as a limited-edition publication and featured interviews of those photographed.

Stores

Acne Studios has retail locations around the world including Stockholm, Gothenburg, Copenhagen, Munich, Berlin, New York, San Francisco, Los Angeles, Milan, Melbourne, Sydney, Antwerp, London, Paris, Oslo, Hong Kong, Tokyo, Nagoya, Seoul, Chengdu, Beijing, and Shanghai.

The Stockholm flagship store on Norrmalmstorg was the location of the 1973 bank robbery and subsequent hostage situation that gave rise to the term Stockholm syndrome for the psychological phenomenon in which hostages express empathy and sympathy toward their captors.

References

External links
 
 Acne Group official site
 Acne Studios Environmental Strategy
 KEX :High fashion brand trade mark.UKIPO 00002252197

Companies based in Stockholm
Clothing brands of Stockholm
Clothing companies of Sweden
Luxury brands
Swedish brands
Swedish fashion
Clothing companies established in 1996
Swedish companies established in 1996
Privately held companies of Sweden